Charles Wheeler may refer to:
Charles Stetson Wheeler (1863–1923), American attorney and University of California Regent
Charles K. Wheeler (1863–1933), U.S. Representative from Kentucky
Charles Wheeler (painter) (1881–1977), Australian painter
Sir Charles Wheeler (sculptor) (1892–1974), former President of the Royal Academy
Charles F. Wheeler (1915–2004), American cinematographer (Tora! Tora! Tora!)
Charles Wheeler (journalist) (1923–2008), journalist with the BBC 
Charles Wheeler (politician) (1926–2022), Missouri politician
Charles Gidley Wheeler (1938–2010), television screenwriter and historical novelist

See also
Charles B. Wheeler Downtown Airport, Kansas City
Charlie Wheeler, character in Friends
Charles Wheler (c. 1620–1683), English cavalry officer and MP